Boleslav Kornelievich Mlodzeevskii, also Mlodzievskii (Pre-Reform Russian: Млодзѣевскій; born , died January 18, 1923) was a Russian mathematician, a former president of the Moscow Mathematical Society.  He was working in differential and algebraic geometry.

Biography 
Mlodzeevskii was born in Moscow July 10, 1858.  His father was a doctor, a professor at Moscow University; he died when Boleslav was seven.  After finishing Moscow gymnasium with a gold medal, he studied at Moscow University, where he received a Ph.D. degree in mathematics in 1886, in differential geometry.  In his dissertation he studied the problem of deformation of surfaces; his advisor was Vasily Zinger.   After two years of studies and work in Göttingen, Paris and Zürich, he return to Moscow to assume a professorship at Moscow University.  With a short gap 1911-1917 when he was forced to leave, he continued working at the university until his death.

He died from diabetes complications in 1923 in Moscow.

Literary references 
In an Andrei Bely fictional novel Moscow Under Siege,  a mathematician named Boleslav Kornielich Mlodzievskii makes an appearance at a meeting of the Moscow Mathematical Society.

References 
 A.N. Kolmogorov and A.P. Yushkevich (eds.) Mathematics of the 19th century: geometry, analytic function theory, p. 24., Birkhaüser, Basel, Switzerland, 1996.
 Boleslav Mlodzeevskii (in memoriam), by Dmitri Egorov, Mat. Sb. 25 (1925), 449–452 (in Russian).
 Andrei Bely, Moscow Under Siege, 1926 (in Russian).

19th-century mathematicians from the Russian Empire
20th-century Russian mathematicians
Differential geometers
Moscow State University alumni
Academic staff of Moscow State University
Mathematicians from Moscow
1858 births
1923 deaths
Deaths from diabetes